WBGI-FM (105.5 MHz) is a radio station broadcasting a classic country radio format. It is licensed to Bethlehem, West Virginia, and it serves the Wheeling metropolitan area. WBGI-FM is owned by Cody Barack through licensee Ohio Midland Newsgroup LLC.

The station has an effective radiated power (ERP) of 13,500 watts. The transmitter is on Highland Lane in Bethlehem, near Interstate 470.

History
Its original call sign was WHLX.

Beginning in 2001, 105.5 was the home of WVKF, a CHR/Top 40 station under the Kiss-FM brand. But the CHR/Top 40 format moved to 95.7 in 2004. After Kiss-FM moved, 105.5 flipped to Classic Hits as "Kool 105.5" under the WUKL call sign.

On August 12, 2021, the station cluster was sold by Forever Media to Cody Barack's Ohio Midland Newsgroup, LLC. The properties included WBGI-FM, WLIE (now WLYV), and WRQY. The price tag was $1,250,000 along with the sale of FM translator W235BX.

On December 28, 2021, Ohio Midland Newsgroup announced that WUKL and WBGI-FM would swap formats on January 3, 2022, at 5:30 a.m. The switch put the classic hits format on 100.5 as a revived "WOMP-FM”, and the country format on 105.5 as "105.5 Biggie Country", with both stations exchanging call signs before the announcement on December 24, 2021.

On September 22, 2022, after stunting with a one day loop of "Achy Breaky Heart" by Billy Ray Cyrus, WBGI-FM changed its format to classic country as "Big Willie 105.5", positioned as "The Greatest Country Hits of the 80s, 90s & More".

References

External links

BGI-FM
Country radio stations in West Virginia
Classic country radio stations in the United States
Radio stations established in 1985
1985 establishments in West Virginia